This is a list of association footballers who have received a winner's medal for playing on a winning team in the Copa Libertadores.  Some players have received medals without playing in the final match: either for being unused substitutes, or, more recently, for being in the squad in earlier rounds of the tournament.

The data below does not include the 1948 South American Championship of Champions, as it is not listed by Conmebol either as a Copa Libertadores edition or as an official competition. However, at least in the years 1996/1997, Conmebol entitled equal status to both Copa Libertadores and the 1948 tournament, in that the 1948 champion club (CR Vasco da Gama) was allowed to participate in Supercopa Libertadores, a Conmebol official competition that allowed participation for former Libertadores champions only (for example, not admitting participation for champions of other Conmebol official competitions, such as Copa CONMEBOL).

See also
 Records and statistics of the Copa Libertadores

References

Citations

players